Ciprian George Negoiță (born 28 April 1992) is a Romanian professional footballer who plays as a defender for Real Bradu.

Honours
Vedița Colonești
Liga III: 2020–21

References

External links
 
 

1992 births
Living people
Romanian footballers
Association football midfielders
FC Argeș Pitești players
CS Mioveni players
CS Pandurii Târgu Jiu players
Liga I players
Liga II players
Liga III players
Sportspeople from Pitești